This is a list of United States magazines.

Automotive

 Automotive News
 Car and Driver
 Four Wheeler
 Hot Rod
 Motor Trend
 Motorcycle Classics
 Road & Track
 Truckin' Magazine (defunct)

Business and finance

Industry

 Aviation Week & Space Technology
 Design News

Finance

 Forbes
 Futures
 Kiplinger's Personal Finance
 Technical Analysis of Stocks & Commodities

General

 Barron's
 Black Enterprise
 Bloomberg Businessweek
 The Chronicle
 Consumers Digest
 Consumer Reports
 The Economist
 Entrepreneur
 Fast Company
 Forbes
 Fortune
 Harvard Business Review
 Inc.
 Latin Trade
 MIT Sloan Management Review
 Optimize
 Site Selection
 The Wall Street Journal
 USA TODAY

Children

 Academy Earth
 American Girl (defunct)
 Scout Life (Formerly Boys' Life)
 Cricket
 Discovery Girls
 Disney Adventures (defunct)
 Highlights for Children
 Jack and Jill
 Lego Magazine
 Muse
 National Geographic Kids Magazine
 Nickelodeon Magazine
 The Open Road for Boys
 Ranger Rick
 Sesame Street Magazine
 Spider
 Sports Illustrated Kids
 Stone Soup
 Zoobooks

Engineering

Electronic

 Chemical & Engineering News
 EE Times
 Electronic Design
 Electronic Products
 IEEE Spectrum

Entertainment and art

 Amazing Heroes (defunct)
 Architectural Digest
 Art in America
 ArtAsiaPacific
 Artforum
 The Artist's Magazine
 The Arts Fuse
 The Boulevard
 Castle of Frankenstein (defunct)
 Cinefantastique (defunct)
 Comics Buyer's Guide (defunct)
 Comics Journal
 Details (defunct)
 Disney Magazine (defunct)
 Dwell
 Entertainment Weekly
 Famous Monsters of Filmland
 The Feet, a dance magazine (1970–1973)
 Film Threat (defunct)
 Flux (defunct)
 The Hollywood Reporter
 Home Media Magazine (defunct)
 Media Play News
 Modern Screen (defunct)
 Moving Pictures (defunct)
 The Pastel Journal
 People
 Photoplay (defunct)
 Popular Photography (defunct)
 Premiere (defunct)
 Sculptural Pursuit
 Shonen Jump (defunct)
 Soap Opera Digest
 Soaps In Depth
 Southwest Art
 Sports Illustrated
 TeRra Magazine
 TV Guide
 Video Watchdog (defunct)
 Visionaire
 Watercolor Artist
 Wizard (defunct)
 Variety

Folklore

 Árran
 Báiki
 Viltis

Food and cooking

 Bon Appétit
 Cooking Light
 Cook's Illustrated
 Fine Cooking
 Food & Wine
 Food Network Magazine
 Gourmet
 Lucky Peach
 Meatpaper
 Saveur
 Taste of Home
 Vegetarian Times
 Zymurgy

Gay interest

 The Advocate
 Curve
 Genre
 Girlfriends (defunct)
 GO (formerly GO NYC)
 Hello Mr.
 Instinct
 MetroSource
 Out
 Out Traveler (defunct)
 XY (defunct)

General interest

 The Believer
 Collier's
 Coronet
 The Drift
 Good
 Harper's Magazine
 Interview
 Latterly
 The Liberator Magazine
 Life (defunct)
 McClure's
 McSweeney's
 National Geographic
 New York Magazine
 The New York Review of Books
 The New Yorker
 Nuestro
 People
 Print
 Reader's Digest
 The Saturday Evening Post
 Smithsonian
 Vanity Fair
 Vanity Fair (1913–1936)

Gossip

 In Touch Weekly
 Life & Style Weekly
 National Enquirer
 OK!
 Star
 Us Weekly

Health

Men

 Details (defunct)
 Esquire
 GQ
 Men's Fitness
 Men's Health
 Men's Journal

Women

 Allure
 Cosmopolitan
 Elle
 Glamour
 Health
 InStyle
 Ladies' Home Journal
 Marie Claire
 McCall's
 O: The Oprah Magazine
 Redbook
 Self
 Shape
 V
 Vogue
 Woman's Day
 W Magazine

General

 Prevention

History

 America's Civil War
 American Heritage
 American Heritage of Invention & Technology
 Armchair General
 Civil War Times
 Invention & Technology
 Military Heritage
 Naval History
 Old News
 Quest: The History of Spaceflight
 True West

Hobby and interest

 Airliners
 Autograph Collector Magazine
 Backpacker
 Birds & Blooms
 Card Player
 Cigar Aficionado
 Kitelife
 Lapidary Journal Jewelry Artist
 Make Magazine
 Model Aviation
 Model Railroader
 Railroad Model Craftsman (formerly known as Model Craftsman)
 Scrye
 Sports Collectors Digest
 Tall Timber Short Lines
 ToyFare (defunct)
 Trains
 Wizard (defunct)

Home and garden

 Architectural Digest
 Better Homes and Gardens
 Dwell
 The Family Handyman
 House Beautiful
 Fine Gardening

Amateur radio

 CQ Amateur Radio
 National Contest Journal
 QEX
 QST

Animals and pets

 Aquarium Fish International (defunct)
 Bird Talk (defunct)
 Freshwater and Marine Aquarium (defunct)
 Horse & Rider
 Reptiles
 Tropical Fish Hobbyist

Board games

 Ares (defunct)
 Chess Life
 Fire & Movement (defunct)
 Games (defunct)
 The General (defunct)
 Knucklebones (defunct)
 Moves (defunct)
 Strategy & Tactics

Numismatics/Coin Collecting

 COINage
  Coins
 Coin World
 Numismatic News
 The Numismatist

Stamp collecting

 The American Philatelist

Tabletop roleplaying games

 Dragon (defunct)
 Dungeon (defunct)
 The Excellent Prismatic Spray
 Pyramid (defunct)
 Warpstone (defunct)

Humor

 Bananas (defunct)
 College Humor (defunct)
 Cracked (defunct)
 Crazy (defunct)
 Fusion (defunct)
 Harvard Lampoon
 Help! (defunct) 
 Humbug (defunct)
 Mad
 National Lampoon (defunct)
 Plop! (defunct) 
 Radar
 Sick (defunct) 
 Stanford Chaparral
 Trump (defunct) 
 The Wittenburg Door (defunct)

Lifestyle

 Cigar Aficionado
 Country Living
 Departures
 Domino
 Ebony
 Essence
 Hello Mr.
 Inked
 Jet
 Jetset Magazine
 Lucky
 Martha Stewart Living
 MaryJanesFarm
 O: The Oprah Magazine
 Paper
 Playboy
 Real Simple
 Robb Report
 Southern Living
 Sunset
 Swindle
 Two Mundos Magazine
 Wine Spectator
 Y'all

Literary

 Arts & Letters
 Bookmarks
 The Midland (defunct)

Men's interest

Music

 Alternative Press
 Bass Player
 Beyond Race Magazine
 Billboard
 Blender (defunct)
 CCM Magazine
 Decibel
 Dirty Linen (defunct)
 Down Beat
 Drum!
 The Fader
 Filter (defunct)
 Flux (defunct)
 Global Rhythm (defunct)
 Goldmine
 Guitar Player
 Guitar World
 Hit Parader (defunct) 
 HM
 Keyboard
 Living Blues
 Maximum RocknRoll
 Modern Drummer
 Paste
 Pulse! (defunct)
 Punk Planet (defunct)
 Revolver
 Rolling Stone
 Sentimentalist Magazine (defunct)
 Sing Out! (defunct)
 The Source
 Spin
 TeRra Magazine
 Trouser Press (defunct)
 Vibe
 WESU Magazine
 Who Put the Bomp (defunct)
 XLR8R
 XXL

News

 The Christian Science Monitor
 National Journal
 Newsweek
 Time
 U.S. News & World Report (defunct)
 The Week
 World

Parenting

 Family Life (defunct)
 Mothering (defunct)
 Parenting (defunct)
 Parents (defunct)

Pharmaceuticals and pharmacies 

 Spectroscopy

Politics

 The American Conservative (right)
 The American Interest
 The American Prospect (liberal, 1990, 100,000)
 The American Spectator (conservative, 1967, 50,000)
 The Atlantic (liberal, 1857, n/a)
 The Brown Spectator (conservative and libertarian, founded 2002, n/a)
 Commentary (neoconservative, 1945, 25,000)
 Commonweal (liberal Catholic, founded 1924, 20,000)
 Democracy (progressive/liberal, 2006, n/a)
 First Things (Christian conservative, 1990, n/a)
 Foreign Affairs (statist, 1922, 181,519)
 Foreign Policy (1970, 101,054)
 The Freeman (libertarian, 1946, n/a)
 Harper's Magazine (liberal, 1850, 220,000)
 Human Events (conservative, 1944, 75,000)
 Human Rights Quarterly (liberal, 1979, 1,533)
 The Imaginative Conservative (conservative, 2010, n/a)
 In These Times (liberal, 1976, 20,000)
 Jacobin (democratic socialist, 2011, 15,000)
 Jewish Currents (Jewish left, 1947, n/a)
 Liberation (pacifist, 1956, n/a)
 Liberty (libertarian, 1987, n/a)
 Lilith (Jewish feminist, 1976, n/a)
 Lumpen (arts, 1991, n/a)
 Moment (Jewish-diverse, 1975, n/a)
 Monthly Review (socialist, 1949, 8,500)
 Mother Jones (left, 1976, 201,233)
 Multinational Monitor (liberal, 1980, n/a )
 The Nation (left, 1865, 139,612)
 National Review (conservative, 1955, 162,091)
 The New Republic (center-left, 1914, 90,826)
 New York (liberal, 1968, 406,237)
 The New York Review of Books (liberal-left, 1963, 140,000)
 The New Yorker (liberal and non-partisan, 1925, 1,062,310)
 Policy Review (center-right, 2001, 6,000)
 Politics (non-partisan, 1980)
 The Progressive (left, 1909, 68,000)
 The Progressive Populist (liberal, 1995, 20,000)
 Reason (libertarian, 1968, 52,000)
 Sojourners (Christian, 1971, n/a)
 Tikkun (Jewish-left, 1971, 20,000)
 Utne Reader (liberal, 1984, n/a)
 Washington Examiner (conservative, 2005)
 Washington Monthly (center-left, 1969, 18,000)
 YaleGlobal Online (international, globalization and anti-globalization, 2002, n/a)
 Z Magazine (left, 1987, 20,000)

Regional interest

 5280
 Arizona Highways
 Baltimore
 Chesapeake Bay
 Chicago
 Contempo Magazine
 D Magazine
 Down East
 Garden & Gun
 Hour Detroit
 Indianapolis Monthly
 Los Angeles
 Midwest Living
 Minnesota Monthly
 New York
 Our State
 Philadelphia
 Texas Monthly
 TeRra Magazine
 Washingtonian
 Yankee

Religion

 Adventist Review
 Adventist World
 America
 Awake!
 Back to Godhead
 Campus Life, now Ignite Your Faith
 The Caribbean Pioneer
 Catholic Digest
 The Christadelphian Tidings of the Kingdom of God
 The Christian Century
 Christian Science Sentinel
 Christianity Today
 Commonweal
 Ensign
 Family Life 
 The Friend
 The Good News
 Gospel Advocate
 Guide
 Guideposts
 Heeb
 Herald
 Hinduism Today
 The Humanist
 Improvement Era
 The Lamp
 Latin Mass Magazine
 Liahona
 Liberty
 The Living Church
 The New Era
 Parabola
 Rays from the Rose Cross
 St. Anthony Messenger
 Signs of the Times
 Sojourners
 Tikkun
 Tricycle: The Buddhist Review
 The Watchtower

Science and technology

 Aeon
 American Scientist
 Archaeology
 Astronomy
 Chemical & Engineering News
 Discover
 Flying
 Infinite Energy
 National Geographic
 Nature
 Nautilus
 New Scientist
 Nexus
 Omni (defunct)
 Popular Mechanics
 Popular Science
 Quanta Magazine
 Science News
 Scientific American
 Scientific American Mind (defunct)
 The Scientist
 Seed
 Skeptic
 Skeptical Inquirer
 Sky & Telescope
 TeRra Magazine
 Weatherwise

Science fiction and fantasy

 Amazing Stories
 Analog Science Fiction and Fact
 Apex Digest
 Asimov's Science Fiction
 Astounding Magazine
 Doctor Who Magazine
 Fantasy and Science Fiction
 Galaxy Science Fiction (defunct)
 Heavy Metal
 If (defunct)
 Imagination (defunct)
 Oceans of the Mind (defunct)
 Omni (defunct)
 Seed (defunct)
 Space Science Fiction (defunct)
 Star Trek: The Magazine (defunct)
 Star Wars Insider

Spanish language

 Latina (defunct)
 El Nuevo Cojo Ilustrado
 Two Mundos Magazine

Sports

 Athletics Weekly
 Athlon Sports
 Baseball Digest
 Bicycling
 Dime Magazine
 ESPN The Magazine (defunct)
 Field & Stream
 Frequency: The Snowboarder's Journal
 Golf Digest
 Golf Magazine
 Inside Sports (defunct)
 Island Sports Media
 KO Magazine (defunct)
 Lindy's Sports
 Pro Football Weekly
 Pro Wrestling Illustrated
 The Ring
 Runner's World
 SLAM Magazine
 Snowboard Magazine
 Soccer America
 Sport (defunct)
 Sporting News
 Sports Illustrated
 Tae Kwon Do Times
 Tennis
 Track & Field News
 WWE Magazine (1983-2014)

Computing and electronics

 2600: The Hacker Quarterly
 Antic (defunct)
 Byte (defunct)
 CIO magazine
 Dr. Dobb's Journal (defunct)
 Kilobaud Microcomputing (defunct)
 Linux Journal
 Linux Magazine
 MacLife
 Macworld
 Maximum PC
 MIT Technology Review
 Modern Electrics (defunct)
 Nuts and Volts
 PC Magazine
 PCWorld
 RUN (defunct)
 SERVO Magazine
 Wired

Teen interest

 Bop (defunct)
 Cosmogirl (defunct)
 Elle Girl (defunct)
 Girls' Life
 J-14
 M (defunct)
 Popstar!
 Right On!
 Seventeen
 Shojo Beat
 Teen (defunct)
 Teen People
 Teen Vogue
 Tiger Beat
 Twist
 YM (defunct)

Travel

 AAA Home and Away
 AAA Living
 AAA Via
 AAA World
 Alaska Beyond Magazine
 American Way (defunct)
 Arizona Highways
 Condé Nast Traveler
 Delta Sky Magazine
 Hemispheres
 National Geographic Traveler (defunct)
 New Mexico Magazine
 Southwest: The Magazine
 Texas Highways
 Travel and Leisure

Video games

 Electronic Gaming Monthly (defunct)
 Game Informer
 GameFan (defunct)
 Nintendo Force
 Nintendo Power (defunct)
 Official Xbox Magazine (defunct)
 PC Gamer
 PlayStation: The Official Magazine (defunct)

Wildlife

Writing

 The Writer
 Writer's Digest
 Writers' Journal

Miscellaneous

 The Black Cannabis Magazine
 The Boulevard
 The Colophon, A Book Collectors' Quarterly (defunct)
 Fidelio 
 Giant Robot (defunct)
 High Times
 Mental Floss
 Newtype USA
 Popular Mechanics
 UFO Magazine (defunct)

See also

 List of journals (disambiguation)
 List of United States magazines with online archives
 Lists of magazines
 Media of the United States
 Sports magazine  List of sports magazines

References 

https://www.theuniversalbreakthroughmag.com/

 List of United States Magazines